Melanie L. Cradle  is a Judge of the Connecticut Appellate Court.

Education 

Cradle earned her bachelor's degree from Adelphi University in 1993, and her Juris Doctor from Seton Hall University School of Law in 1998.

Judicial career

Connecticut superior court 

Cradle was appointed to the superior court by Governor Dannel Malloy in 2013. She has heard criminal cases in Bridgeport for a year before moving to the New Haven Judicial District in 2014. In 2015, she became the presiding judge in GA 23 in New Haven. Cradle also serves on the Law Library Advisory Committee, the Rules Committee of the Superior Court, and the Criminal Justice Commission.

Connecticut Appellate Court 

On July 20, 2020, Governor Ned Lamont announced the appointment of Cradle to the Connecticut Appellate Court to the seat being vacated by Judge Robert J. Devlin Jr. who reaches mandatory retirement age in April 2020. Upon her appointment, Judge Cradle will become the first African-American woman to serve on the Appellate Court.

Memberships 

Cradle has served as a member of the National College of District Attorneys, the National Association of Black Prosecutors, the Ansonia/Milford Multidisciplinary Team, and the State of Connecticut Division of Criminal Justice Diversity Committee. She was also a mentor for the Lawyers Collaborative for Diversity.

Personal 

At her original confirmation hearing, Cradle noted that her parents married in 1967, the year when the U.S. Supreme Court struck down laws prohibiting interracial marriage in Loving v. Virginia, the state where her father lived before entering the U.S. Army. Her parents met while her father was a serviceman overseas.

References

External links 

1970s births
Living people
20th-century American lawyers
21st-century American judges
21st-century American lawyers
Adelphi University alumni
African-American judges
African-American lawyers
Connecticut lawyers
Connecticut state court judges
Judges of the Connecticut Appellate Court
Quinnipiac University faculty
Seton Hall University School of Law alumni
Superior court judges in the United States
20th-century African-American people
21st-century African-American people
People from Middlefield, Connecticut
People from Durham, Connecticut